The siege of Saguntum was a battle which took place in 219 BC between the Carthaginians and the Saguntines at the town of Saguntum, near the modern town of Sagunto in the province of Valencia, Spain. The battle is mainly remembered today because it triggered one of the most important wars of antiquity, the Second Punic War.

Hannibal's plans
After Hannibal was made supreme commander of Iberia (221 BC) at the age of 26, he spent two years refining his plans and completing his preparations to secure power in the Mediterranean. The Romans did nothing against him though they received ample warning of Hannibal's preparations. The Romans even went so far as turning their attention to the Illyrians who had begun to revolt. Because of this, the Romans did not react when news reached them that Hannibal was besieging Saguntum. The capture of Saguntum was essential to Hannibal's plan. The city was one of the most fortified in the area and it would have been a poor move to leave such a stronghold in the hands of the enemy. Hannibal was also looking for plunder to pay his mercenaries, who were mostly from Africa and the Iberian Peninsula. Finally, the money could be spent on dealing with his political opponents in Carthage.

The siege
During Hannibal's assault on Saguntum, he suffered some losses due to the extensive fortifications and the tenacity of the defending Saguntines, but his troops stormed and destroyed the city's defenses one at a time. Hannibal was even severely wounded in the thigh by a javelin, and fighting was stopped for a few weeks while he recovered.

The Saguntines turned to Rome for aid, but none was sent. In 218 BC, after enduring eight months of siege, the Saguntines' last defenses were finally overrun. Hannibal offered to spare the population on condition that they were "willing to depart from Saguntum, unarmed, each with two garments". When they declined the offer and began to sabotage the town's wealth and possessions, every adult was put to death.

This marked the beginning of the Second Punic War. Hannibal now had a base of operations from which he could supply his forces with food and extra troops.

Aftermath

After the siege, Hannibal attempted to gain the support of the Carthaginian Senate.  The Senate (controlled by a relatively pro-Roman faction led by Hanno the Great) often did not agree with Hannibal's aggressive means of warfare, and never gave complete and unconditional support to him, even when he was on the verge of absolute victory only five miles from Rome. In this episode, however, Hannibal was able to gain limited support which permitted him to move to New Carthage where he gathered his men and informed them of his ambitious intentions.  Hannibal briefly undertook a religious pilgrimage before beginning his march toward the Pyrenees, the Alps, and Rome itself. The next phase of the war was marked by extraordinary Carthaginian victories at Trebia, Lake Trasimene, and the Battle of Cannae.

Legacy
At the end of the 1st century AD the siege of Saguntum was described in much detail by the Latin author Silius Italicus in his epic poem Punica. In his verses several Saguntine leaders and heroes stand out (Sicoris, Murrus, Theron), as well as a Libyan warrior princess fighting for Carthage (Asbyte), but very few historians give the tale any credit as a historical source.

In 1727 the English dramatist Philip Frowde wrote a tragedy entitled The Fall of Saguntum which was based on Silius' poem.

The death metal band Ex Deo has a song called "Hispania (The Siege of Saguntum)" on their album The Immortal Wars.

See also
Alorcus

References

Saguntum
Saguntum
Saguntum
Saguntum
Saguntum
Sagunto
Last stands